U.S. Route 19 (US 19) runs south to north up through central West Virginia. The route runs from the Virginia state line at Bluefield, Virginia north to the Pennsylvania state line south of Mount Morris, Pennsylvania.

Route description

US 19 passes through the limits of the cities and towns of Bluefield, Princeton, Beckley, Oak Hill, Fayetteville, Summersville, Flatwoods, Weston, Jane Lew, Clarksburg, Shinnston, Worthington, Monongah, Fairmont, Rivesville, Westover, Morgantown, Star City, in addition to the smaller communities of Kegley, Spanishburg, Flat Top, Ghent, Cool Ridge, Shady Spring, Daniels, Beaver, Johnstown, Hico, Heaters, Napier, Letch, Ireland, Ben Dale, Homewood, Kitsonville, Hepzibah, Meadowbrook, Enterprise, Arnettsville, Georgetown.

Between Bluefield and Beckley, US 19 has been largely supplanted by Interstate 77 and the West Virginia Turnpike. Between Prosperity and northeast of Canfield, the route serves as a major southwest-northwest artery as Corridor L of the Appalachian Development Highway System (ADHS). It is along Corridor L that it crosses the New River via the well-known New River Gorge Bridge. Between Canfield and into Pennsylvania, the route has largely supplanted by Interstate 79.

Aside from the four-lane limited access Corridor L, US 19 remains largely two-lane rural road with numerous curves outside of major cities.

Major intersections

References

External links

 West Virginia
Transportation in Braxton County, West Virginia
Transportation in Fayette County, West Virginia
Transportation in Harrison County, West Virginia
Transportation in Lewis County, West Virginia
Transportation in Marion County, West Virginia
Transportation in Mercer County, West Virginia
Transportation in Monongalia County, West Virginia
Transportation in Nicholas County, West Virginia
Transportation in Raleigh County, West Virginia
19